Tim Crichton (born 15 April 1976) is a former professional tennis player from Australia.

Crichton, partnering Ashley Fisher, made the semi-finals of the 2001 Chevrolet Cup in Chile, his best result on the ATP Tour. Also that year he was a quarter-finalist in the Japan Open, with Michaël Llodra as his teammate.

In 2002 he competed in the Men's Doubles at all four Grand Slams and made the second round twice. In that year's French Open, Crichton and countryman Todd Perry defeated Karsten Braasch and Andrei Olhovskiy. He then partnered Mark Merklein at the Wimbledon Championships and the pair had a win over Luke Milligan and Kyle Spencer.

Challenger titles

Doubles: (9)

References

1976 births
Living people
Australian male tennis players
Place of birth missing (living people)
20th-century Australian people
21st-century Australian people